Howard Richardson may refer to:
 Howard Richardson (footballer) (1894–1959), Australian rules footballer and cricketer
 Howard Richardson (playwright) (1917–1985), American playwright
 Col. Howard Richardson (born 1922), pilot of the 1958 Tybee Island B-47 crash